Musculair 1 and Musculair 2 are two human-powered aircraft designed and built by German academic and engineer Günther Rochelt.

Musculair 1
Rochelt designed Musculair 1 and completed building it in 1984. His son, Holger, won a Kremer prize in the same year for his flight over a  triangular course, improving the record to 4 minutes and 25 seconds. Later that year, Holger and his sister Katrin, at that time still a child, became the first passengers in a human-powered aircraft.

 Length: 7.20 m
 Wingspan: 22.00 m
 Wing area: 16.50 m2
 Glide ratio: 1:38
 Height: 2.20 m
 Mass of the aircraft: 28 kg
 Propeller diameter: 2.72 m
 Required minimum power: 200 watts
 Required performance: 280 watts

Musculair 2
The record, which still stands as of 2023, was set over a circuit at the Sonderlandeplatz Oberschleißheim airfield, near Munich.

Length: 6.00 m
Wingspan: 19.50 m
Wing area: 11.70 m2
Glide ratio: 1:37
Height: 1.50 m
Mass of the plane: 25 kg
Propeller diameter: 2.68 m

Aircraft on display
Today, Musculair I is on display at the main Deutsches Museum, Munich. Musculair 2 is on display at the specialist Deutsches Museum Flugwerft Schleissheim in Oberschleißheim.

See also
Solair
List of human-powered aircraft

References

External links

Data on Musculair 2

Human-powered aircraft
High-wing aircraft
Aircraft first flown in 1984
Pusher aircraft
Single-engined pusher aircraft